Abdullah Al Shemali (born 18 June 1988, in Kuwait City) is a Kuwaiti football midfielder, who plays for the  Kuwaiti Premier League club Al Qadsia.

He played for Al-Arabi in the 2007 AFC Champions League group stage.

References

1988 births
Living people
Kuwaiti footballers
Kuwait international footballers
2011 AFC Asian Cup players
Al-Arabi SC (Kuwait) players
Association football midfielders
Sportspeople from Kuwait City
Kuwait Premier League players